Ernst Friedrich Löhndorff (13 March 1899  – 16 March 1976) was a German sailor, adventurer, and writer. He was born in Frankfurt am Main and died in Waldshut-Tiengen).

In 1913, at the age of 14, Löhndorff ran away from his home with the intent to become a sailor and get to know the world. He travelled the world as a sailor and adventurer until 1927. His first of over 30 novels, “Bestie Ich in Mexiko” (engl. “I, Beast, in Mexico” ), was published in 1927. His novels were translated in a dozen languages and were quite popular until after the Second World War. His books were reprinted in 2017, published by Casssiopeia-XXX-press. His biography is available.

Biography

Childhood and youth 
Löhndorff was the youngest child of the merchant Robert Löhndorff and his wife Paulina Augusta Raabe. Born in Frankfurt on 13 March 1899, he was baptized on 27 August 1899. In 1902 his family moved to Vienna. His father was often absent due to business travels and later left the family. Consequently, Löhndorff practically grew up without a father.

Starting 16 September 1905 Löhndorff attended the Volksschule (elementary school) in Hietzing and later the public Realschule (secondary modern school). In 1912 he had to repeat the class due to excessive absence.

Seamanship 
In spring 1913 Löhndorff ran away from home to become a sailor. In Hamburg he signed on to a Dutch sailing ship as cabin boy. When he returned to the harbor of Delfzijl, the Netherlands, from a journey to Finland and Russia, his father and local police were already expecting him.

After a discussion Löhndorff's father agreed to let him pursue his way as a sailor. He hired on the four-masted barque “Thielbek” that was sailing to Mexico. At the end of September 1914 the ship reached his destination, where it was seized because of the beginning of First World War. Being greatly bored on the seized vessel, Löhndorff fled and went on to many adventures in Mexico.

First World War 
Löhndorff fled from the seized vessel after a short time because he was bored and wanted to pursue his quest for adventures. He worked in diverse jobs, including as coastal sailor.

After a shipwreck he hoped for help from the German consul in Guaymas. But as he couldn't provide documents, and his family resided in Austria, the consul did not believe him that he was German. After leaving the consulate Löhndorff met a Yaqui of the Revolutionary Force and signed in with the Forces. He was promoted soon, because, among other things, he was able to translate English text to his superiors. He met the revolutionary Pancho Villa.

Löhndorff was not interested in the political issues behind the revolution. In January 1916 he witnessed how revolutionary troops fetched 17 US civilians out of a train and, under order from Pancho Villa, executed them on the spot. This changed Löhndorff's mind. But because he was present at the site and part of the situation, the US put a bounty on his head. A punitive expedition under general John Pershing remained unfinished because the troops were ordered back in 1917 when the US entered the First World War.

War captivity 

Löhndorff tried to get away from Mexico. Together with deserted sailors he captured the vessel “Alexander Agassiz”. They sailed under the German flag but were themselves captured by the US Marine after only four weeks. Löhndorff was arrested and put into prison in Los Angeles in February 1918. From there he was transferred to the War Barracks III in Fort Utah (Utah) as prisoner of war no. 638. During this imprisonment Löhndorff met captain Conrad Sörensen whose sailor classes he attended. After the end of war Löhndorff managed to receive provisional documents through the Swiss embassy. They enabled him to eventually leave the United States and return to Europe. On 11 July 1919 Löhndorff arrived in Rotterdam harbor as passenger of the sailor  “Martha Washington”. German authorities expecting him there and, after several interrogations, allowed him to enter Germany, travelling to Karlsruhe, where his family had settled during war times.

French Foreign Legion 
In post war years Löhndorff joined the French Foreign Legion. Why he did so remains unclear. He may have done so due to financial problems or simply to follow his urge for adventures. On 13 November 1920 he signed in for five years in Saarbrücken, using the false name “Ernesto de Naca e Villaverde” and false birthplace Veracruz, but giving his real birth date of 13 March 1899.

He seems to have been in Algeria but deserted after only two months and fled the country. His book “Afrika weint - Tagebuch eines Legionärs” (engl. Africa cries - Diary of a Legionnaire) reflects his experiences in the Foreign Legion in Africa. But, as nearly all his books, this adventure novel mixes real events with fiction. His autobiographic style often gives the impression that Löhndorff reports his own adventures. But in many cases this is not the case. However, his travels and adventures were a strong source of inspiration for his stories.

Publications

Books 

The following bibliography lists the first editions of his novels as they are given in the Catalogue of the German National Library. Some of the crime novels he published under the pseudonym of Peter Dando were later republished under his real name.

 Bestie Ich in Mexiko (1927) Stuttgart: Dieck & Co.
 Satan Ozean: Von Schnapspiraten, Trampfahren und Walfängern (1930) Leipzig: Grethlein & Co.; Bremen: C. Schünemann
 Afrika weint: Tagebuch eines Legionärs (1930) Leipzig: Grethlein & Co.
 Amineh: Die zehntausend Gesichter Indiens (1931) Leipzig ; Zürich: Grethlein; Bremen: Schünemann
 Noahs Arche: Eine Saga von Mensch und Wal (1932) Leipzig ; Zürich: Grethlein; Bremen: Schünemann
 Blumenhölle am Jacinto: Urwalderlebnis (1932) Leipzig ; Zürich: Grethlein; Bremen: Schünemann
 Der Indio: Kampf und Ende eines Volkes (1933) Bremen: Schünemann
 Trommle, Piet!: Deutsche Landsknechte im Urwald (1934) Bremen: Schünemann
 Gold, Whisky und Frauen in Nordland (1935) Bremen: Schünemann
 Der Narr und die Mandelblüte (1935) Bremen: Schünemann
 Südwest-Nordost: Erlebnisschildergn (1936) Bremen: Schünemann
 Tropensymphonie (1936) Bremen: Schünemann
 Der Geheimnisvolle von Baden-Baden (1936) Bern ; Leipzig ; Wien: Goldmann (Goldmanns Roman-Bibliothek, Band 54); as Peter Dando
 Seltsame Pfade auf 10 Grad Süd (1937) Bremen: Schünemann
 Bowery-Satan (1937) Bern ; Leipzig ; Wien: Goldmann (Goldmanns Roman-Bibliothek ; Band 69); as Peter Dando
 Die Frau von Hawai (1938) Bremen: Schünemann
 Unheimliches China: Ein Reisebericht (1939) Bremen: Schünemann
 Die schwarze Witwe (1939) Dresden: Seyfert; as Peter Dando
 Yangtsekiang: Ein Chinaroman (1940) Bremen: Schünemann
 Khaiberpaß (1941) Bremen: Schünemann
 Gloria und der Teddyboy: Amerik. Sittenbild (1943) Bremen: Schünemann
 Old Jamaica Rum (1949) Düsseldorf: Vier Falken Verl.
 Ultima Esperanza: Aufstieg und Ende des "Königs von Feuerland" (1950) Bremen: Schünemann
 Ägyptische Nächte (1952) Schloss Bleckede a.d. Elbe: Meissner
 Stimme aus der Wüste: Muhamed Ibn Abd'Allah Ibn Abd. el Mottalib Ibn Hadschim el Emin. (1953) Bremen: Schünemann
 Gelber Strom (1954) Bremen: Schünemann
 Wen die Götter streicheln: Indischer Tatsachenroman (1954) Berlin ; München: Weiss
 Schwarzer Hanf: Roman eines Rauschgiftes (1956) Bremen: Schünemann
 Der Weg nach Dien Bien Phu: Roman einer Kolonie (1957) Bremen: Schünemann
 Glück in Manila (1958) Berlin-Schöneberg: Weiss
 Sturm über Kenia (1960) Bremen: Schünemann
 Gelbe Hölle am Jangtsekiang (1965) Hannover: Fackelträger-Verl. Schmidt-Küster, (1979) Prisma Verlag 200 pp. ISBN 3570004473
 Der Vogel Cockaburra (1966)' Hannover: Fackelträger-Verl.

 Translations 
Many of Löhndorffs novels were translated to—all in all—at least 12 different languages: Danish, English, French, Flemish (Belgium), Italian, Serbo-Croatian, Dutch, Polish, Spanish, Swedish, Czech, Hungarian.

 References 

 La Gazette des Français du Paraguay, Ernst Löhndorff - Chasseur d'orchidées, Un grand roman à l'épreuve du temps - El cazador de orquideas, Una novela de aventuras a prueba de tiempo'' - bilingue français espagnol - numéro 8, Année 1, Asuncion Paraguay.

1899 births
Writers from Frankfurt
1976 deaths
Soldiers of the French Foreign Legion
German male writers
People of the Mexican Revolution